The Last Gasp is a novel by Trevor Hoyle published in 1983.

Plot summary
The Last Gasp is a novel in which  industrialization leads to oxygen depletion, causing mass deaths, social upheavals, and mutations.

Reception
Dave Pringle reviewed The Last Gasp for Imagine magazine, and stated that "If one could carry this fairly conventional bestseller back 130 years in a time machine and give it to Mr Dickens to read, one suspects it would be utterly beyond his comprehension. The world has moved on, and the hard times have changed indeed."

Reviews
Review by Dan Chow (1983) in Locus, #275 December 1983
Review by Don D'Ammassa (1984) in Science Fiction Chronicle, January 1984

References

1983 novels